On November 16, 2015 the beta version of the European Data Portal was launched. The European Data Portal is an initiative of the European Commission, and is part of the Digital Single Market.

Purpose 
The European Data Portal was created to gather Public Sector Information of the 28 European Member States and the four EFTA countries. These countries are also referred to as the EU28+.

Public Sector Information that can be freely re-use for any purpose is commonly referred to as Open Data. The EU28+ countries publish public data on national data portals and geospatial portals. In order to provide one single access point to all of this data, the European Data Portal was created. On the portal, only metadata (data about the data) is shown. This metadata is directly harvested from the existing portals through the use of APIs.

On April 21, 2021 the portal was consolidated with the EU Open Data Portal into data.europa.eu - offering metadata of datasets previously available from both former catalogues in one place.

The data is gathered in order to promote the re-use of the public data. By re-using this data, several benefits can be achieved.

Content 
The European Data Portal provides access to the data sets in different ways, via:
 Direct search;
 Data catalogues; and
 SPARQL queries.

However, the European Data Portal is not just a repository for public data. The Portal offers different content:
 Open Data News;
 Re-use stories;
 Goldbook for Open Data providers;
 e-Learning tool on Open Data; and
 Library with Open Data materials.

References

European Commission
Information technology organizations based in Europe
Open data
Open government
Open data portals